Deep Springs (formerly, Deep Spring) is a set of artesian springs in Inyo County, California that were used for irrigation.
It lies within the treaty territory of the Western Bands of the Shoshone Nation of Indians (Timbisha Band of Western Shoshone Indians).

Deep Springs College is located in Deep Springs Valley, although not at the site of the springs. The Deep Springs post office operated from 1881 to 1883 and from 1920 to 1953. The springs, after which the town was named, are now called Buckhorn Springs.

References

Reference bibliography 

Unincorporated communities in California
Unincorporated communities in Inyo County, California